Elijah Hunt Mills (December 1, 1776May 5, 1829) was an American politician from Massachusetts.

Early life
Mills was born in Chesterfield, Massachusetts. He was educated by private tutors and graduated from Williams College in 1797. Mills studied law, was admitted to the bar, and commenced practice in Northampton, Massachusetts.

Career
He was the district attorney for Hampshire County, Massachusetts, and opened Northampton Law School in 1823. Mills was also a founding member of the American Antiquarian Society in 1812.

He was a member of the Massachusetts House of Representatives (1811–1814). Mills was elected as a Federalist to the United States House of Representatives (March 4, 1815 - March 3, 1819). In 1819 he returned to the Massachusetts House of Representatives, where he became Speaker of the House in 1820. He was elected to the United States Senate in 1820 to fill the vacancy caused by the resignation of Prentiss Mellen. Mills was reelected and served from June 12, 1820, to March 3, 1827. He was an unsuccessful candidate for reelection in 1826. He retired from public life due to ill health.

Personal life
Mills was first married to Sarah Hunt (1780–1802), a daughter of Dr. Ebenezer Hunt and Sarah ( Bradish) Hunt, on May 16, 1802. Sarah died a few months later on October 2, 1802. Mills later married Harriet Blake (1780–1871), a daughter of merchant Joseph Blake and Deborah ( Smith) Blake. With his second wife, Mills was the father of seven children, including:

 Helen Sophia Mills (1806–1844), who married Hon. Charles Phelps Huntington.
 Sarah Hunt Mills (1808–1887), who married Prof. Benjamin Peirce, the father of Charles Sanders Peirce.
 Elijah Hunt Mills Jr. (1810–1830), who died unmarried in Charleston, South Carolina.
 Charles Henry Mills (1813–1872), a merchant who married Anna Cabot Lowell Dwight (1818–1880), a daughters of Edmund Dwight.
 William Kilby Mills (1815–1855), an invalid for the last 20 years of his life; he died unmarried.
 Harriette Blake Mills (1818–1892), who married Admiral Charles Henry Davis.
 George Francis Mills (1821–1829), who died young.

Mills died on May 5, 1829 in Northampton, and was interred in the Bridge Street Cemetery. His widow died at Cambridge on February 9, 1871.

Descendants
Through his daughter Harriette, he was a grandfather of Anna Cabot Mills Davis, who married U.S. Senator Henry Cabot Lodge. One of their sons, poet George Cabot Lodge, was the father of U.S. Senators Henry Cabot Lodge Jr. and John Davis Lodge.

References

External links
 

1776 births
1829 deaths
People from Chesterfield, Massachusetts
American people of English descent
Massachusetts National Republicans
Federalist Party members of the United States House of Representatives from Massachusetts
Federalist Party United States senators from Massachusetts
National Republican Party United States senators from Massachusetts
Members of the Massachusetts House of Representatives
Speakers of the Massachusetts House of Representatives
County district attorneys in Massachusetts
Members of the American Antiquarian Society
Williams College alumni
Burials in Massachusetts